This is a list of parliamentary by-elections in England held between 1689 and 1700, with the names of the previous incumbent and the victor in the by-election.

In the absence of a comprehensive and reliable source, for party and factional alignments in this period, no attempt is made to define them in this article. The House of Commons: 1690–1715 and The House of Commons: 1660–1690 provides some guidance to the complex and shifting political relationships, but it is significant that the compilers of those works make no attempt to produce a definitive list of each members allegiances.

Dates
During this period England counted its legal year as beginning on 25 March. For the purposes of this list the year is considered to have started on 1 January.

By-elections
The c/u column denotes whether the by-election was a contested poll or an unopposed return. If the winner was re-elected, at the next general election and any intermediate by-elections, this is indicated by an * following the c or u. In a few cases the winner was elected at the next general election but had not been re-elected in a by-election after the one noted. In those cases no * symbol is used.

Convention Parliament of 1689 (1689–1690)

1st Parliament of William III & Mary II (1690–1695)

2nd Parliament of William III (1695–1698)

3rd Parliament of William III (1698–1700)

References

 
 The House of Commons 1660–1690, edited by Basil Duke Henning (Published for the History of Parliament Trust by Secker & Warburg 1983) 
 The House of Commons 1690–1715, edited by David Hayton (Cambridge University Press 2002)

External links
 History of Parliament: Members 1690–1715
 History of Parliament: Constituencies 1690–1715
 History of Parliament: Members 1660–1690 
 History of Parliament: Constituencies 1660–1690

By-elections 1689
By-elections to the Parliament of England
17th century in England
By-elections 1689 to 1700